Gymnostachyum febrifugum is a herb endemic to the southern Western Ghats of India. It has medicinal value.

The species is classified as a member of the order Lamiales, family Acanthaceae, and genus Gymnostachyum.

References

External links

 
 Places where seen
 More information

Acanthaceae
Endemic flora of India (region)